The TM-170 is an armored personnel carrier was announced for the first time in 1978 and entered production in 1979. It was originally designed primarily for use as an APC or an internal security vehicle, but could be adapted for a wide range of other roles.

The TM 170 was originally developed by Thyssen Henschel which subsequently became part of Rheinmetall Landsystem. Today, the TM-170 is considered a legacy product of Rheinmetall MAN Military Vehicles, part of Rheinmetall's Vehicle Systems Division.

The equivalent vehicle in the current RMMV portfolio is the Survivor R.

History
Around 370 TM-170 were produced in total. The TM 170 was selected by the German Border Guard (Bundesgrenzschutz) and state police forces to replace the old MOWAG MR 8 series of APCs, designated the SW1 and SW2. The TM 170 was designated the SW4 (Sonderwagen 4 for special wagon 4), the SW3 being the armoured version of the Mercedes-Benz 4 × 4 light vehicle. The first order for 87 vehicles was placed in July 1982 with deliveries running from 1983 onwards.

The TM-170 is mainly used by Public Order and Crowd Control Police (Bereitschaftspolizei) of the state police forces and airport security enforcement of the Federal Police (Bundespolizei). The former Bundesgrenzschutz which was renamed into Bundespolizei in 2005 had a total of 121 TM 170, but these have now been phased out of service.

South Korean companies Doosan Infracore Defense Products BG, Shinjeong and Korea Vehicle Corporate offer near-copies of the TM-170. It is not clear what, if any, licensing arrangement exists between Rheinmetall and Doosan/Shinjeong/Kovico. Doosan offer the Barracuda with Shinjeong offer the S-5 while Korea Vehicle Corporate offer the Black Shark. The South Korean-made APCs are in service with Indonesia, Malaysia, South Korea and Vietnam.

Design
The TM-170 is based on Mercedes-Benz Unimog chassis and components. The hull of the TM 170 is of all-welded steel providing protection from small arms fire and shell splinters.

The vehicle is modular, and can be fitted with the following optional equipment: auxiliary heater, fire warning and extinguishing system, hydraulically operated 5,000 kg capacity winch with 40 m of 13 mm diameter cable, public address system, police flashing lights, radio, NBC filtering system and run-flat tyres. As well as the standard version a fully amphibious version was developed and marketed, but none are thought to have been sold. Armament on the TM-170 is optional and it is capable of being equipped with a pintle- or ring-mounted 7.62 mm machine gun, a turret armed with twin 7.62 mm MGs, or a turret armed with a 20 mm cannon.

Operators

Thyssen Henschel versions
 : Federal Police. 
 : Reported to have 25 TM-170s.
 : Formerly used by German law enforcement. Used by the Bundesgrenzschutz.
 : Icelandic Search and Rescue association have two that were given by the German government in 2001 for use in high wind rescue missions and are stationed in two of the windiest places in Iceland, Akranes and Öræfi. They are named "the dragon" and "the taliban".
 
 : Used by Grand Ducal Police.
 : According to the United Nations Arms Transfer lists, Germany transferred 115 TM-170s to Macedonia in 1999 and another 105 in 2000. These are deployed under the local name of the Hermelin (Stoat/Ermine in English). Around 100 of these are thought to remain serviceable. Most used in anti-insurgency operations. Modifications include a PKT or a NSV machine gun turret. Known to be used by Special Task Unit "Tiger" and the Army of North Macedonia.

Hanhwa Defence versions
 : 25 Barracudas to be sold by 2024 to the Indonesian National Police.

Shinjeong Development versions
 : 21 S-5s exported in 2004 for €EUR5 million. 31 anti-riot vehicles for the Indonesian National Police in 2007 for €EUR4.7 million.
 : 4 S-5s exported in 2008 to the Malaysian Police for $USD 2 million.
 : Used by South Korean troops in 2004 in Iraq. Two S-5s purchased by Korean National Police Agency.
 : In service with Vietnamese Public Security Police with the Cảnh sát cơ động (Mobile Police) for anti-riot duties.

Korea Vehicle Corporate versions
 : Exported to Indonesia in 2012.

Gallery

Notes

References

Armoured personnel carriers of Germany
Armoured personnel carriers of South Korea
Military vehicles introduced in the 1970s
Wheeled armoured personnel carriers
Armoured personnel carriers of the Cold War

de:Sonderwagen#Sonderwagen 4 (TM-170)